Callistus Chukwu (born 14 November 1990) is a Nigerian professional footballer who plays as a midfielder for a Finnish club AC Kajaani. He began his career at Emmanuel Amunike Soccer Academy.

References

External links
 
 

1990 births
Living people
Nigerian footballers
Association football midfielders
Ykkönen players
Kakkonen players
AC Kajaani players
Oulun Työväen Palloilijat players
Närpes Kraft Fotbollsförening players
Kajaanin Haka players
Nigerian expatriate footballers
Nigerian expatriate sportspeople in Finland
Expatriate footballers in Finland
JS Hercules players